The Huai goat breed from the region of Henan in China is used for the production of meat.  They are usually white.

References

Goat breeds
Meat goat breeds
Goat breeds originating in China